Julian Samuel is a Canadian documentary filmmaker, writer and painter. He has produced and directed a number of films that examine the historical and contemporary relationship between the Western world, the Middle East and Asia set against larger subjects in contemporary society. Palestine's struggle for self-determination is a recurring theme in his work. Notable films include Atheism (2006), Save and Burn (2004) and The Library in Crisis (2002). [[McGill University and The University of Toronto have his archive of works.

Biography
Julian Samuel was born in Lahore, Pakistan. His family emigrated to the UK and then to Canada.
 After graduating from Trent University with a degree in literature, he established himself in Montreal from 1982 onwards. Samuel was awarded an MFA from Concordia University, where he subsequently taught at the graduate level, focusing on aesthetics in documentary filmmaking. He resides in Toronto, Ontario, Canada.

Career
Samuel has made a number of films that examine the historical and contemporary relationship between the West, the Middle East and Asia set against larger subjects in contemporary society. Palestine's struggle for self-determination is a recurring theme in his work among other post-colonial themes.

He is the author of Radius Islamicus (2018)Passage to Lahore (1995) and Lone Ranger in Pakistan (1986). On the book jacket of  Passage to Lahore, Cameron Bailey, artistic director of the Toronto International Film Festival, writes "the bravest piece of writing to emerge from our carefully confused Canada...(T)he book is unafraid of anger, unafraid of ideas and unafraid of speaking the wrong thing."

Passage to Lahore received mixed reviews upon its French release in Quebec. The book contains criticism of the Quebec provincial government's political agenda to preserve Quebecois culture resulting in a muting of minority representation in the arts.

He is a frequent contributor to Serai, a Montreal-based not-for-profit web magazine focused on arts, culture and politics.

Samuel is also an abstract expressionist painter.
www.julianjsamuel.com

Bibliography
 Radius Islamicus (2018) Guernica Editions 
 Passage to Lahore (1995) The Mercury Press 
 Lone Ranger in Pakistan (1986) Emergency Press

Filmography
 2014: Beulah in Lahore and other places
 2009: Must Exit 
 2006: Atheism
 2006: Played the role of Aashir in Carolyn Combs' film Acts of Imagination
 2004: Save and Burn
 2002: The Library in Crisis
 1999: Lettres du Caire
 1996: Into the European Mirror
 1995: The City of the Dead and World Exhibitions
 1993: The Raft of the Medusa
 1984: Resisting the Pharaohs
 1983: The Long Sleep and Big Goodbye
 1982: Dictators
 1979: Black Skin, White Masks

References

1952 births
Living people
Pakistani emigrants to Canada
Naturalized citizens of Canada
Canadian documentary film directors
20th-century Canadian novelists
Canadian writers of Asian descent
Canadian male novelists
20th-century Canadian male writers